This List of Castles in Ireland, be they in Northern Ireland and thus United Kingdom or in the Republic of Ireland, is organised by county within their respective jurisdiction.

Republic of Ireland

County Carlow

County Cavan

County Clare

County Cork 

Aghamarta Castle
Aghamhaoila Castle
Ballea Castle
Ballinacarriga Castle
Ballincollig Castle
Ballintotis Castle
Ballybeg Castle
Ballyclogh Castle
Ballyhooly Castle
Ballymaloe Castle
Ballynamona Castle
Ballyrobert Castle
Barryscourt Castle, restored castle 	
Belvelly Castle
 Ballyva Manor, built in the 1850s by Timothy Hurley	
Blackrock Castle, restored castle
Blackwater Castle, restored castle	
Blarney Castle, restored castle
Buttevant Castle
Carrigacunna Castle
Carrigadrohid Castle
Carrigleamleary castle
Carrignamuck Castle
Carriganass Castle		
Carrigaphooca Castle
Carrigboy Castle
Carrignacurra Castle
Carrigrohane Castle
Castle Barrett
Castle Bernard
Castle Cooke
Castle Donovan (Sowagh), ruins which underwent conservation in 2014
Castle Downeen
Castle Eyre
Castle Freke, ruins in process of restoration
Castle Harrison (Charleville), destroyed
Castle Hyde
Castle Kevin
Castle Lishen
Castle Lyons
Castle Magner
Castle Mallow, see Mallow Castle
Castle Mary
Castle Park
Castle Pook
Castle Richard
Castle Ringaskidy
Castle Salem
Castle Townsend
Castle Warren
Castle Widenham, see Widenham Castle (Castletown Castle)
Castle White
Castle Wrixon
Castlemahon
Castlemartyr
Castleminsters
Castlesaffron
Cloghan Castle
Conna Castle		
Coolmaine Castle, restored castle previously owned by Roy Disney
Coppingerstown Castle
Coppingers Court
Cor Castle
Creagh Castle
Cregg Castle
Crowley Castle
Davis' Castle
Desmond Castle, restored castle 
Dripsey Castle
Drishane Castle, restored castle
Dromagh Castle
Dromaneen Castle
Duarrigle Castle
Dunalong Castle
Dunasead Castle		
Dunboy Castle
 Dundareirke Castle, castle ruins		
Dunlough Castle, or Three Castles Head
Dunmahon Castle
Dunmanus Castle, castle ruins
Enchicrenagh Castle ruin
Eustace's Castle
Garryvoe Castle, tower house ruins
Glengarriff Castle
Gortmore Castle
Ightermurragh Castle, castle ruins
Kanturk Castle 
Kilbolane Castle
Kilbrittain Castle, restored castle
Kilcaskan Castle
Kilcolman Castle
Kilkoe castle, = Jeremy Irons' castle		
Kilcor Castle
Kilcrea Castle, castle ruins
Kilnannan Castle
Lohort Castle
Lumbard´s Castle
Macroom Castle, castle ruins	
Mallow Castle, castle ruins	
Milltown Castle
Mistletoe Castle
Mitchelstown Castle, demolished
Mogeely Castle
Monanimy Castle
Monkstown Castle
Mountlong Castle
Rathberry Castle ruin
Ringrone Castle
Rostellan Castle
Siddon's Tower
Tynte's Castle
Wallstown Castle
Widenham Castle, restored castle

County Donegal 

Ballyshannon Castle
Burt Castle
Carrickabraghy Castle
Doe Castle/Caisleán na dTuath, Restored Castle
Donegal Castle, Restored Castle.
Drumboe Castle
Glenveagh Castle, Complete Castle
Monellan Castle
Mongavlin Castle
Greencastle, castle ruins
O'Doherty Castle, castle ruins
Rahan Castle, castle ruins
Raphoe Castle, castle ruins

County Dublin 

Archbold's Castle, Dalkey. Intact, private property. National monument.
Ardgillan Castle, Ardgillan Demesne, Balrothery
Artaine Castle, Artaine
Ashtown Castle, Phoenix Park.
Athgoe Castle, Newcastle, intact,
Ballyowen Castle, Lucan, ruins incorporated into the Ballyowen Castle Shopping Centre
Balrothery Castle, intact
Baymount Castle, Heronstown, Clontarf
Belgard Castle, Tallaght, HQ of CRH Holdings
Bremore Castle, Balbriggan, under repair
Bullock Castle
Carrickmines Castle, ruins, buried beneath recent road work
Castle Bagot, Kilmactalway, Newcastle, intact, health spa
Castle Mount, Clogh
Castle Park (Castle Perrin), Monkstown, intact,
Castleknock Castle
Cheeverstown
Clonskeagh Castle, Roebuck. 19th century, on site of earlier castle.
Clontarf Castle, Clontarf. Restored Castle, Hotel.
Conn Castle, intact
Corr Castle
Corrig Castle Dun Laoghaire, demolished.
Dalkey Castle, Dalkey. Intact, 14th century. National monument. 
Donabate, intact
Drimnagh Castle, Drimnagh. Restored Castle.
Drumcondra Castle, Richmond. Conference centre  	
Dublin Castle, Dublin City. Restored Castle
Dundrum Castle, Dundrum. Ruins	
Dunsoghly Castle, Restored Castle	
Howth Castle, Howth.
Grange, intact?
Irishtown Castle, ruin
Kilgobbin Castle, ruin,
Killiney Castle, Scalpwilliam or Mount Mapas.
Killininny Castle, Firhouse
Kilsallaghan Castle
Knocklyne (Knocklyon) Castle, Knocklyon. Intact, private residence.
Lambay Castle, Lambay Island
Lanestown, intact
Lehaunstown or Laughanstown Castle, concealed within a later manor house.
Luttrellstown Castle, Restored Castle
Merrion Castle
Malahide Castle, Malahide Demesne. Restored Castle	
 Merrion Castle, Merrion.	
Monkstown Castle, Monkstown Castlefarm. Ruin
Murphystown, ruins, the proposed Luas line B1 runs approximately 28m west of the ruins of Murphystown Castle and through its area of archaeological potential.
Nangor Castle, Nangor.
Portrane castle (Stella's Tower), intact
Puck's Castle, Shankill. Ruin 
Rathfarnham Castle, Rathfarnham Demesne. Restored Castle
Rathmines Castle, Rathmines West.
Robswall, intact
Roebuck Castle, Roebuck. Hall of residence UCD campus 
Sarsfield Castle, intact
Seatown
Shangannagh Castle, ruins, not to be confused with the late 18th-century house of the same name
Shankill Castle, Shankill. NIAH survey, brief history, Ruin
Simmonscourt Castle, Smotscourt.NIAH survey
Stillorgan Castle, Stillorgan. 18th-century house on site of earlier castle, now incorporated into the modern St John of God hospital complex. NIAH survey
Swords Castle, castle ruins, undergoing restoration
Tallaght Castle, Tower House, incorporated into the buildings of St. Mary's Priory in Tallaght village
Templeogue House NIAH survey
Thorncastle
Tully's Castle, Clondalkin, ruins, Picture
Tymon Castle, Tymon North. Demolished in the 1970s
Williamstown Castle, Williamstown.NIAH survey

County Galway 

Abbeyglen Castle, restored castle website
Ardamullivan Castle, restored castle 
Athenry Castle, restored castle info
Aughnanure Castle, intact castle
Ballindooley Castle, restored castle 
Ballinfad Castle, intact castle
Ballymore Castle, restored castle 
Ballynahinch Castle, intact castle
Caheradangan Castle, intact castle
Caherkinmonwee Castle, intact castle
Cargin Castle, restored castle 
Castle Ellen, restored castle 
Castle Kirk, castle ruins
Castletown Castle, castle ruins
Clifden Castle, castle ruins
Cloghan Castle, restored castle 
Cloonacauneen Castle, restored castle 
Corofin Castle, castle ruins	
Cregg Castle, restored castle 
Derryhivenny Castle, castle ruins	
Dunguaire Castle, restored castle 
Dunsandle Castle, restored castle 
Eyrecourt Castle, castle ruins	
Feartagar Castle, castle ruins	
Fiddaun Castle, castle ruins
Garbally Castle, castle ruins	
Glinsk Castle, castle ruins
Hackett Castle, castle ruins
Isert Kelly Castle, intact castle
Kilcolgan Castle, intact castle
Kylemore Abbey, Benedictine monastery
Lynch's Castle, restored castle 
Menlow Castle (also Menlo or Menlough), castle ruins
Monivea Castle, castle ruins
Moyode Castle, castle ruins	
Oranmore Castle, restored castle 
Portumna Castle, restored castle 	
Thoor Ballylee, W.B. Yeats' former holiday home, restored as a museum. Closed after flooding.

County Kerry 

Ardea Castle
Ballybunnion Castle 
Ballingarry Castle
Ballinskelligs Castle
Ballybunion Castle
Ballycarbery Castle
Ballycarty Castle
Ballyheigue Castle
Ballymalis Castle
Ballyseedy Castle, Hotel
Cappanacuss Castle
Carrigafoyle Castle
Carrignass Castle
Castle Sybil
Castle of the Island
Derryquin Castle
Dromore Castle		
Dunbeg Fort
Dunkerron Castle
Dunloe Castle
Gallarus Castle
Listowel Castle
Minard Castle
Parkavonear Castle
Ross Castle, restored castle OPW info	
Staigue Fort

County Kildare 

Barberstown Castle, restored castle 
Barretstown Castle, restored castle 
Carbury Castle, castle ruins
Grange Castle, castle ruins
Jigginstown Castle (Sigginstown House), castle ruins Info
Kildare Castle, castle ruins
Kilkea Castle, restored castle 
Kilteel Castle, Intact Castle Info
Leixlip Castle, restored castle 
Maynooth Castle, Intact Castle
Rathcoffey Castle, castle ruins Info
Reeves Castle, intact castle
Rheban Castle, castle ruins Info
White's Castle, restored castle

County Kilkenny 

Annaghs Castle, castle ruins
Ballinlaw Castle, castle ruins
Ballybur Castle, restored castle
Ballyragget Castle, castle ruins
Burnchurch Castle, intact castle
Clara Castle, intact castle 
Clomantagh Castle, restored castle
Coolhill Castle, castle ruins
Corluddy Castle, castle ruins
Currahill Castle, castle ruins
Dunkitt Castle, castle ruins
Foulksrath Castle, intact castle
Gorteens Castle, castle ruins
Gowran Castle, castle ruins
Granagh Castle, castle ruins
Kilbline Castle, intact castle
Kilkenny Castle, restored castle info
Kilmurry Castle, castle ruins
Maudlin Castle, restored castle
Sandfordscourt Castle, castle ruins
Shankill Castle, restored castle

County Laois 

Aghmacart Castle, ruins of a tower house
Ballaghmore Castle, restored castle
Ballinakill Castle, tower house in Ballinakill village
Ballyadams Castle, castle ruins
Ballyknocken Castle, very ruinous tower house
Castle Durrow, 19th Century house on the site of a former castle
Castlecuffe, ruins of 17th Century fortified house 
Castle Fleming, Ruins of fortified house
Coolbanagher Castle, Hall House which collapsed in 2014
Clonreher Castle, intact tower house outside Portlaoise
Cullahill Castle, castle ruins
Dysart Castle, remains consist of a turret of the bawn. 
Fermoyle Fortified House, ruins of fortified house
Gortnaclea Castle, castle ruins
Grantstown Castle, ruins of circular tower house
Killeany Castle, ruins of tower house along the River Note
Lea Castle, massive Norman ruins similar to Carlow Castle
Rock of Dunamase, castle ruins
Rushall Fortified House, ruins of a 17th Century fortified house
Shaen Castle, fragment of tower house
Strahane Castle, ruins of tower house
Shrule Castle, castle ruins
Tinnakill Castle, tower house
Clonburren Castle, tower house

County Leitrim 

Lough Rynn Castle, restored castle
Manorhamilton Castle, restored castle
Parke's Castle, restored castle info

County Limerick 

Adare Manor
Askeaton Castle
Ballygrennan Castle
Black Castle
BeaghCastle ruin		
Bourchier's Castle		
Carrigogunnell Castle		
Castle Matrix Rathkeale restored by Sean O'Driscoll USAF. 
Castle Oliver, also known as Clonodfoy, 
Castle Troy
Croom Castle
Desmond Castle
Dromore Castle ruin
Glin Castle (Old)
Glin Castle, Hotel
King John's Castle, Limerick City	
Lisnacullia Castle
Oola Castle
Rockstown Castle
Springfield Castle, available for rent		
Williamstown Castle

County Longford 

Castle Forbes, restored castle info
Moydow Castle, castle ruins

County Louth 

Ardee Castle, restored castle
Barmeath Castle, restored castle
Castle Bellingham, intact castle
Castle Roche, castle ruins
Castletown Castle, restored castle
Darver Castle, restored castle
Hatch's Castle, intact castle
King John's Castle, restored castle
Knockabbey Castle, restored castle
The Mint, restored castle
Smarmore Castle, intact castle
Taaffe Castle, castle ruins	
Termonfeckin Castle, survivor of two tower houses, other demolished ca. 1800.

County Mayo 

Aghalard Castle, castle ruins
Ahena Castle, castle ruins. 
Ashford Castle, hotel
Belleek Castle, restored castle
Crossmolina Castle, castle ruins
Deel Castle, castle ruins
Doon Castle, castle ruins
Kildavnet Castle, intact castle
Kinlough Castle, castle ruins
Rappa Castle, castle ruins
Rockfleet Castle, restored castle
Shrule Castle, castle ruins
Turin Castle, restored castle
 Dookinella Castle

County Meath 

The Black Castle, castle ruins
Donore Castle, castle ruins
Dunsany Castle, restored castle
Lynches Castle (Summerhill), castle ruins
Durhamstown Castle, intact castle
Killeen Castle, restored castle
Skryne Castle, restored castle
Slane Castle, restored castle	
Tara, castle ruins
Dangan Castle (Summerhill), castle ruins
Trim Castle, restored castle OPW info

County Monaghan 

Castle Leslie
Rossmore Castle ruin
Hope Castle recently burned down

County Offaly 

Ballycowan Castle, castle ruins
Birr Castle, restored castle
Blundell Castle, castle ruins
Charleville Castle, restored castle
Clara Castle (County Offaly), castle ruins
Cloghan Castle, restored castle
Clonmacnoise Castle, castle ruins
Clonony Castle, castle ruins
Doon Castle, castle ruins
Grange Castle, intact castle
Kinnitty Castle, restored castle
Leap Castle, under restoration
Sragh Castle, castle ruins

County Roscommon 

Ballintober Castle, castle ruins
Castlecoote, Castlecoote House and castle ruins
Donamon Castle, restored castle
Kilronan Castle, restored castle
MacDermott's Castle, Castle Island on Lough Key. castle ruins
Roscommon Castle, castle ruins
Rindoon Castle, castle ruins
Castle Sampson, castle ruins

County Sligo 

Ardtermon Castle, restored castle
Ballinafad Castle, castle ruins
Ballymote Castle, castle ruins
Markree Castle History, restored castle
Moygara Castle, castle ruins Castle Website
Roslee Castle, castle ruins
Temple House Castle, castle ruins Manor & Castle History

County Tipperary 

Annameadle Castle, castle ruins
Ardfinnan Castle, intact castle
Ballyfinboy Castle, castle ruins with Sheela na gig, near Borrisokane
Ballyquirk Castle, castle ruins
Ballynahow Castle, intact castle
Ballysheedy Castle,  castle ruins
Black Castle, Templemore, castle ruins
Black Castle, Thurles, castle ruins
Cahir Castle, restored castle OPW info
Carrigeen Castle, restored castle
Clonakenny Castle, castle ruins
Castle Fogarty, restored castle
Cranagh Castle, intact castle
Farney Castle , restored castle
Kilcash Castle, castle ruins
Killaghy Castle , restored castle
Killahara Castle, restored castle
Knockgraffan, early ráth
Lackeen Castle, tower house near Lorrha where the Lorrha Missal was discovered in the 18th century.
Lisheen Castle, restored castle
Loughmoe Castle, castle ruins
Moorstown Castle, castle ruins, located between Clonmel and Cahir.
Nenagh Castle, intact castle
Ormonde Castle, Manor House. OPW info
Redwood Castle, Tower House near Lorrha
Rock of Cashel, restored castle
Roscrea Castle, intact castle
Shanbally Castle, demolished
Slevoyre House, restored castle

County Waterford 

Ballycanvan Castle, castle ruins
Ballyclohy Castle, castle ruins
Ballyheeny Castle, castle ruins
Ballymaclode Castle, castle ruins
Barnakile Castle, castle ruins
Carrowncashlane Castle, castle ruins
Clonea Castle, castle ruins
Coolnamuck Castle, castle ruins
Crooke Castle, castle ruins
Cullen Castle, castle ruins
Derrinlaur Castle, castle ruins
Dungarvan Castle, restored castle
Dunhill Castle, castle ruins
Dunmore East Castle, castle ruins
Faithlegg Castle
Feddans Castle, castle ruins
Fox's Castle, castle ruins
Glen Castle, castle ruins
Greenan Castle
Kilmeaden Castle, castle ruins
Kincor Castle, castle ruins
Lismore Castle, restored castle
Loughdeheen Castle, castle ruins
MacGrath's Castle, castle ruins
Mountain Castle, castle ruins
Rathgormuck Castle, castle ruins
Reginald's Tower OPW info, part of the old city walls of Waterford
Rockett's Castle, castle ruins	
Sleady Castle, castle ruins
Strancally Castle, castle ruins
Waterford Castle, restored castle, now a hotel

County Westmeath

County Wexford 

Adamstown Castle - tower house
Baldwinstown Castle - castle ruins
Ballyteigue Castle - tower house
Ballyhack Castle, restored castle  OPW info
Ballyhealy Castle, restored Norman castle
Bargy Castle, restored castle.
Barntown Castle, tower house and castle ruins
Clougheast Castle, restored castle
Dungulph Castle, intact castle
Enniscorthy Castle, restored castle
Ferns Castle, restored castle. OPW info
Ferrycarrig Castle, castle ruins
Johnstown Castle, intact castle
Mountgarret Castle (New Ross), castle ruins
Rathlannon Castle, castle ruins
Rathmacknee Castle, castle ruins
Sigginstown Castle, castle ruins
Slade Castle, castle ruins
Tellarought Castle (New Ross), castle ruins

County Wicklow 

Carnew Castle, Carnew. Tower house ruins, built in the late 16th century.
Castle Howard Wicklow, intact castle with the addition of a 19th-century Mansion.
Dunganstown Castle, Dunganstown. Remains of a large late-17th century U-plan house and early 17th century tower.
Glenart Castle, Arklow. Intact castle in use as a hotel.
Fassaroe Castle, Bray. Built in 1536 by 'Master Tresover'. In ruins.
Kiltegan Castle, Kiltegan, intact castle
Kiltimon Castle, Newcastle.  C.1550, now in use as a folly.
Kindlestown Castle, Delgany. Castle ruins
Oldcourt Castle, Bray. Built by the Earl of Ormond in 1433. In ruins.
Ormonde Castle, Arklow. Castle ruins, built in 1169 on an old Viking site and destroyed by Oliver Cromwell's army in the 17th century.
Rathdown Castle. Ruined by the 17th century, very little remains.
 Threecastles Castle, Manor Kilbride, Blessington. Largely intact late 14th/15th-century castle marking the boundary of the Pale.
The Black Castle, Wicklow Town (now ruins). In 834 AD the Vikings fortified a strategic rocky promontory at the mouth of the Vartry River in Wicklow Town. Following the Norman invasion a castle was subsequently built, now known as the Black Castle. Between 1295 and 1315 the castle was attacked and burnt down twice by the local O'Byrne Clan.

Northern Ireland

County Antrim

County Armagh

County Down

County Fermanagh

County Londonderry

County Tyrone

See also
Abbeys, priories and historic houses
Abbeys and priories in the Republic of Ireland
Historic houses in England
Historic houses in Northern Ireland
Historic houses in the Republic of Ireland
Historic houses in Scotland
Historic houses in Wales
Castles
Castles in England
Castles in Scotland
Castles in Wales
History of Ireland
List of country estates in Northern Ireland
List of castles in the Republic of Ireland
List of abbeys and priories in Northern Ireland
List of abbeys and priories in the Republic of Ireland

Notes

Citations

References

 
 

 
 
 
 
 
 
 
 
 
 
 
 
 

Ireland
Castles in Ireland
Lists of castles in the United Kingdom

Lists of buildings and structures in Northern Ireland
Castles

Castles
Ireland